American stand-up comedian, actor, writer and filmmaker Louis C.K. began his career performing stand-up while simultaneously making short films. When he was 17, he directed a comedic short film titled Trash Day (1984). His third short film, Ice Cream, won the grand prize at the Aspen Shortsfest in 1993. In the same year, he began writing for Late Night with Conan O'Brien before leaving the next year. His next writing job was on Late Show with David Letterman in 1995, and directed a series of shorts for Howie Mandel's Sunny Skies on television, followed by acting as head writer for The Dana Carvey Show (1997) and a writer on The Chris Rock Show (1997–1999). He voiced a fictional version of himself on four episodes of Dr. Katz, Professional Therapist from 1996 to 2002. He directed his first feature, Tomorrow Night, in 1998, which failed to attract any distributors and was later re-released by C.K. on his website in 2014.

In the early 2000s, he continued to collaborate with actor-comedian Chris Rock. They co-wrote Down to Earth in 2001 and C.K. wrote and directed Pootie Tang (which C.K. was fired from during editing) later that year – both featured Rock in acting roles. In 2002, he voiced Brendon Small's estranged father, Andrew Small, in Home Movies. His first leading role was the short-lived HBO sitcom Lucky Louie, which he also wrote, in 2006. He worked again with Rock as a writer again with the comedy I Think I Love My Wife (2007). After performing stand-up on several television shows from the late 1980s, he released his first stand-up special, Shameless, in 2007. In 2008, he wrote, performed in, directed, executive produced, and edited Chewed Up, and acted in Diminished Capacity, Welcome Home Roscoe Jenkins, and Role Models (all 2008). His next film role was in The Invention of Lying (2009).

Since 2010, C.K. has starred in, written, directed, edited, and produced the comedy-drama series Louie on FX. He stars as a fictionalized version of himself, a divorced father and comedian. The series has garnered critical acclaim and has won numerous awards. In 2010, his stand-up film Hilarious premiered at the Sundance Film Festival. His next special was Live at the Beacon Theater (2011). He first hosted Saturday Night Live in November 2012, and subsequently hosted it on three more occasions in 2014, 2015, and 2017. He played a love interest in Woody Allen's Blue Jasmine and an FBI agent's boss in David O. Russell's American Hustle (2013). C.K.'s next specials were Oh My God (2013) and Live at the Comedy Store (2015). He co-created, co-writes and executive produces FX's Baskets and wrote, directed, produced, and co-starred in the comedy-drama series Horace and Pete, which was released unexpectedly to his website in 2016. He played the lead voice role in The Secret Life of Pets in the same year.

In the year 2017, the funnyman auteur wrote, directed, produced, edited, and starred in the unreleased seriocomic film I Love You, Daddy.

For his work performing stand-up, writing, acting, directing, producing and editing, C.K. has received several awards and nominations. Among them are 39 Emmy Award nominations, with six wins.

Film

Television

Standup specials

Web releases

Documentary appearances

Notes

References

External links

Male actor filmographies
Director filmographies
American filmographies